Camino Tassajara (Spanish for "Path of Carne Seca") is a census-designated place in Contra Costa County, California. The 2010 United States census reported Camino Tassajara's population was 2,197.

Geography
According to the United States Census Bureau, the CDP has a total area of 1.261 square miles (3.265 km), all of it land.

Demographics

At the 2010 census Camino Tassajara had a population of 2,197. The racial makeup of Camino Tassajara was 876 (39.9%) White, 53 (2.4%) African American, 4 (0.2%) Native American, 1,117 (50.8%) Asian, 1 (0.0%) Pacific Islander, 33 (1.5%) from other races, and 113 (5.1%) from two or more races. Hispanic or Latino of any race were 138 people (6.3%).

The census reported that 100% of the population lived in households.

There were 632 households, 433 (68.5%) had children under the age of 18 living in them, 503 (79.6%) were opposite-sex married couples living together, 47 (7.4%) had a female householder with no husband present, 26 (4.1%) had a male householder with no wife present.  There were 16 (2.5%) unmarried opposite-sex partnerships, and 5 (0.8%) same-sex married couples or partnerships. 44 households (7.0%) were one person and 7 (1.1%) had someone living alone who was 65 or older. The average household size was 3.48.  There were 576 families (91.1% of households); the average family size was 3.65.

The age distribution was 799 people (36.4%) under the age of 18, 94 people (4.3%) aged 18 to 24, 734 people (33.4%) aged 25 to 44, 476 people (21.7%) aged 45 to 64, and 94 people (4.3%) who were 65 or older.  The median age was 35.2 years. For every 100 females, there were 98.8 males.  For every 100 females age 18 and over, there were 96.1 males.

There were 642 housing units at an average density of ,of which 632 were occupied, 517 (81.8%) by the owners and 115 (18.2%) by renters.  The homeowner vacancy rate was 0.6%; the rental vacancy rate was 0.9%.  1,884 people (85.8% of the population) lived in owner-occupied housing units and 313 people (14.2%) lived in rental housing units.

References

Census-designated places in Contra Costa County, California
Census-designated places in California